The Women event of the 2015 World Allround Speed Skating Championships was held on 7–8 March 2015.

Results

500 m
The race was started at 12:04.

3000 m
The race was started at 13:23.

1500 m
The race was started at 11:00.

5000 m
The race was started at 13:05.

Overall standings
After all events.

References

Women
World